Jesús Hernández Blázquez (born 28 September 1981) is a Spanish former road bicycle racer, who competed professionally between 2004 and 2017, for the , , ,  and  teams. He now works as a directeur sportif for UCI Continental team .

Career
Born in Ávila, Hernández turned professional in 2004, and has taken part in the Vuelta a España three times, but withdrew on the first two occasions during the third week. He finished 19th in the 2009 event.

He is well known as being the long-term friend and domestique of Alberto Contador, accompanying Contador at each of his last four teams as a professional cyclist. During the Astana years Lance Armstrong applied to him the nickname "Sweet baby Jesus".

He rode his first Tour de France in 2010 with  being part of Contador's winning team, although that title was later stripped.

Major results

2005
 9th Overall Tour de Langkawi
 10th Prueba Villafranca de Ordizia
2006
 5th Prueba Villafranca de Ordizia
 9th Gran Premio de Llodio

Grand Tour general classification results timeline

References

External links

 

1981 births
Living people
People from Ávila, Spain
Sportspeople from the Province of Ávila
Spanish male cyclists
Cyclists from Castile and León